Susan Wicks (born 1947 Kent, England) is a British poet and novelist.

She studied at the University of Hull, University of Sussex. She taught at University College, Dublin, University of Dijon, and the University of Kent. 
She teaches at Goldsmiths, University of London.
She lives in Tunbridge Wells.

Awards
Singing Underwater won the 1992 Aldeburgh Poetry Festival Prize.
The Clever Daughter was shortlisted for both the 1996 T. S. Eliot Prize, and 1996 Forward Poetry Prize. Her translation of Valérie Rouzeau's Pas Revoir (Cold Spring in Winter) won the 2010 Scott Moncrieff Prize, and it was shortlisted for the 2010 Griffin Poetry Prize and the 2010 Oxford-Weidenfeld Translation Prize. She won the 2014 Oxford-Weidenfeld Translation Prize for her translation of Valérie Rouzeau's Talking Vrouz.

Works

Poetry
Singing Underwater, Faber and Faber, 1992 
Open diagnosis , Faber and Faber, 1994, 
The Clever Daughter, Faber and Faber, 1996, 
Night Toad: New & Selected Poems, Bloodaxe Books, 2003, 
De-iced, Bloodaxe Books, 2007, 
House of Tongues, Bloodaxe Books, 2011, 
The Months, Bloodaxe Books, 2016,

Poetry translations 
Valérie Rouzeau, Cold Spring in Winter, Arc, 2009, 
Valérie Rouzeau, Talking Vrouz, Arc, 2013, 
Writing the Real: A Bilingual Anthology of Contemporary French Poetry (translated Michèle Métail), 2015. Enitharmon Press

Memoir
 Driving My Father, Faber and Faber, 1995,

Novels
 The Key, Faber and Faber, 1997, 
 Little Thing. Faber and Faber, 1998,

Short stories
 Roll Up for the Arabian Derby, bluechrome, 2008,

References

External links

1947 births
Living people
English women poets
English women novelists
20th-century English poets
21st-century English poets
20th-century English novelists
People from Royal Tunbridge Wells
Alumni of the University of Hull
Alumni of the University of Sussex
Academics of Goldsmiths, University of London
Literary translators